John Barrie Pook (born 2 February 1942) is a British poet.

John Pook was born at Neath in South Wales, but grew up in Gowerton, near Swansea, and attended Gowerton Boys Grammar School. He afterwards took master's degrees, in English at Queens' College, Cambridge University (1964), and in Linguistics at Bangor University.

He has worked as an editor for an airline reservation company, and lives in the South of France. He has contributed to many poetry magazines and anthologies, and has published two collections of his verse –  That Cornish Facing Door published by Gomer Press (1975) and Needing the Experience (2008).

In 1971, Pook won the Eric Gregory Award for Poetry.

References

British poets
People from Swansea
1942 births
Living people
Welsh poets
People educated at Gowerton Grammar School
British male poets
Alumni of Queens' College, Cambridge